Commander Video is an alternate reality game and viral marketing campaign created by Gaijin Games and Aksys Games in order to promote their WiiWare game Bit.Trip Beat. It is named after the protagonist of the Bit.Trip series of games.

Background 
Commander Video began when an anonymous e-mail was sent to gaming network IGN on December 19, 2008, containing a link to a video that depicted two people uncovering a mysterious object that flashed strange images with a voiceover saying, "I am only a man." On December 30, somebody with the screen name "Commander Video" began leaving cryptic messages on several websites containing a link to www.commandervideo.com. Commander Video distributed clues via email and Twitter, and issued missions involving advertising the game to a group of ten "recruits."

On January 9, 2009, Nintendo Power spoiled the game early, revealing the title and publisher. Later, the codename of this game was confirmed, in an email between a player of the alternate reality game and the person running the alias of Commander Video, to be "BTB."

See also
 List of alternate reality games

References

External links
 CommanderVideo website
 Gaijin Games website
 Official Bit.Trip Beat website
 IGN article "Who is the Commander?"
 Web.archive.org file

Promotional alternate reality games
Choice Provisions games